Out Stack or Ootsta is an island in Shetland.

It is one of the North Isles of the Shetland Islands and lies within the Hermaness National Nature Reserve.

It is uninhabited and there is no landfall directly to the north.

Description
Out Stack is little more than a rocky outcrop, and is uninhabited. It has been described as "the full stop at the end of Britain". Travellers would not encounter any further land masses between Out Stack and the North Pole if heading directly north.

Lady Franklin
Lady Franklin, the wife of the Arctic explorer Sir John Franklin, landed on Out Stack after John Rae's reports of the fate of the Franklin expedition had reached Stromness, Orkney, where she lived, in 1853/54.

Hermaness National Nature Reserve
The Hermaness National Nature Reserve covers the Muckle Flugga rocks and Out Stack, as well as the seabird cliffs and moorland of Hermaness.

References

External links

Stacks of Scotland
Uninhabited islands of Shetland
Unst